Bhestan railway station is a small railway station on the Western Railway network in the state of Gujarat, India. Bhestan railway station is 10 km away from Surat railway station. Passenger, MEMU, and Express trains halt here.

Trains

 19003/04 Bandra Terminus–Bhusaval Khandesh Express
 59049/50 Valsad–Viramgam Passenger
 59037/38 Virar–Surat Passenger
 69149/50 Virar–Bharuch MEMU
 69141/42 Sanjan–Surat MEMU
 59439/40 Mumbai Central–Ahmedabad Passenger
 59441/42 Ahmedabad–Mumbai Central Passenger
 69151/52 Valsad–Surat MEMU
 09069 Vapi–Surat Passenger Special
 09070 Surat– Valsad MEMU Special
 59048 Surat–Valsad Shuttle
 69139 Borivali–Surat MEMU

Notes

References

See also
 Surat district

Railway stations in Surat district
Mumbai WR railway division
Transport in Surat